Tomás Allende y García-Baxter (4 February 1920 – 10 February 1987) was a Spanish politician who served as Minister of Agriculture of Spain between 1969 and 1975, during the Francoist dictatorship.

References

1920 births
1987 deaths
Agriculture ministers of Spain
Government ministers during the Francoist dictatorship